The 1984 European Indoors  was a women's tennis tournament played on indoor carpet courts at the Saalsporthalle Allmend in Zurich, Switzerland that was part of the 1984 Virginia Slims World Championship Series. The tournament was held from 29 October through 4 November 1984. Third-seeded Zina Garrison won the singles title.

Finals

Singles
 Zina Garrison defeated  Claudia Kohde-Kilsch 6–1, 0–6, 6–2
 It was Garrison's 1st career title.

Doubles
 Andrea Leand /  Andrea Temesvári defeated  Claudia Kohde-Kilsch /  Hana Mandlíková 6–1, 6–3
 It was Leand's 2nd title of the year and of her career. It was Temesvári's only title of the year and the 4th of her career.

External links
 ITF tournament edition details
 Tournament draws

European Indoors
Zurich Open
European Indoors
European Indoors
European Indoors